Yan Junling (born 28 January 1991) is a Chinese professional footballer who currently plays for Chinese Super League club Shanghai Port.

Club career
Yan Junling started his football career when he joined the Genbao Football Academy in 2001 and was promoted to Shanghai SIPG's first team during the 2007 season. He played as the backup goalkeeper for Gu Chao between 2007 and 2010. After Gu transferred to Hangzhou Greentown in early 2011, Yan became the first-choice goalkeeper for the club. Yan made 24 league appearances in the 2012 season as Shanghai won the second tier league title and was subsequently promoted to the top flight.

International career
Yan made his debut for the Chinese national team on 13 December 2014 in a 4–0 win against Kyrgyzstan. However, this match was not recognised as an international "A" match by FIFA. He finally made his official debut on 27 March 2015 in a 2–2 draw against Haiti, coming on as a substitute for Wang Dalei.

Career statistics

Club statistics
.

International statistics

Honours

Club
Shanghai SIPG
Chinese Super League: 2018
China League One: 2012
China League Two: 2007
Chinese FA Super Cup: 2019

Individual
Chinese Football Association Goalkeeper of the Year: 2017, 2018, 2019
Chinese Super League Team of the Year: 2017, 2018, 2019
Chinese FA Super Cup Most Valuable Player: 2019

References

External links
 
 

1991 births
Living people
Chinese footballers
Footballers from Shanghai
Shanghai Port F.C. players
Chinese Super League players
China League One players
China League Two players
Association football goalkeepers
2015 AFC Asian Cup players
2019 AFC Asian Cup players
China international footballers